Ashwani is a given name. Notable people with the name include:

Ashwani Kumar (born 1952), Indian politician
Ashwani Kumar (police officer) (born 1950), Indian politician
Ashwani Kumar Sharma, Indian politician
Ashwani Kumar Sharma (J&K politician), Indian politician
Ashwani Lohani, Indian businessman
Ashwani Mahajan, Indian economist
Ashwani Sekhri, Indian politician